Pursuant to Article 44 of the Law on Internal Regulations of the Islamic Consultative Assembly (Parliament of the Islamic Republic of Iran), the Article 90 of the Constitution Commission of the Islamic Consultative Assembly is formed in order to organize and streamline the Assembly and the representatives, especially in relation to the work of the Executive, Judiciary and Parliament branches, based on various articles of the constitution, especially its ninetieth article. The structure of the members of this commission is as follows:

 One representative from each specialized commission of the Assembly
 Eight representatives elected by the heads of branches and the board of directors of the Assembly as permanent members

Note 1- The chairman of the commission is elected from among the permanent members of the commission by the proposal of at least two people by the board of directors of the Assembly and with the vote of the representatives for a term of one year.

Therefore, in ideal conditions, the commission has 8 permanent members and 13 other members.

The Article 90 of the Constitution Commission is one of the Privileged commissions of the Islamic Consultative Assembly to deal with public complaints about the work of the three branches (executive, judiciary, legislature). Each of these branches exercises power separately, and are relatively separate. Accordingly, in order to prevent tyranny as well as to guarantee the freedom and security of the people, it must be monitored by an official overseeing the proceedings of these forces so that each does not go beyond its legal framework.

Article 90 of the Constitution of Iran 
Article 90 of the Constitution of the Islamic Republic of Iran states:

Organizational structure

Legal duties and powers 
According to Article 90 of the Constitution of the Islamic Republic of Iran, as well as the approvals and internal regulations of the Islamic Consultative Assembly, the legal duties and powers of this commission are as follows:

 Organizing and streamlining the parliament and the representatives.
 Investigate the workings of the parliament, the executive branch, the judiciary and their officials, as well as the relevant complaints, and demand response from them.
 Announcing the results of the proceedings, and informing the public in cases where the matter is of public concern.
 Examining the reports read by the specialized commissions from the tribune of the parliament according to their request, and announcing the result to the parliament.
 Correspondence and referral to the three branches (the parliament, the executive, the judiciary) and their ministries, departments, affiliated organizations, foundations, revolutionary institutions and other institutions that are in some way related to one of them.
 Introducing the offending officials to the competent judicial authorities to impose legal penalties.
 Sending an inspector or inspectors to investigate complaints, and the need for cooperation of relevant authorities.
 Reporting violations by the officials of the branches (in their way of working) to the competent judicial authorities for out-of-turn investigations.
 Legal action regarding the final report of the investigation received from the specialized commissions.
 Submitting public reports to the board of directors of the parliament, and reading it in the public meetings of the parliament.
 Request for an extraordinary inspection from the General Inspection Office of Iran.

Units 
The Article 90 of the Constitution Commission of the Islamic Consultative Assembly has two units:

 Procedures handling and grievance redressal unit
 Administrative affairs office

Scope of authority 
The Article 90 of the Constitution Commission of the Islamic Consultative Assembly operates in three scopes:

 The scope of the executive branch and related complaints
 The scope of the judiciary and related complaints
 The scope of parliamentary proceedings (and special affairs) and related complaints

Note: In each of these three scopes, the commission can form committees as appropriate.

The Article 90 of the Constitution Commission is not a judicial authority and does not issue rulings, and its work has no judicial meaning, but is due to the oversight of the parliament in the implementation of laws, and the work of the parliament is inherently political and not judicial.

The scope of parliamentary proceedings is very wide, and the Article 90 of the Constitution Commission begins with the word "everyone". This means that any natural or legal person can file a complaint, but this general permission does not imply that he \ she can file any complaint to the parliament and request a hearing.

Committees 
The Article 90 of the Constitution Commission of the Islamic Consultative Assembly has five permanent committees in the scope of the executive branch and related complaints as follows:

The Commission has also one permanent committees in the scope of the judiciary and related complaints as follows:

The Commission has also one permanent committees in the scope of parliamentary proceedings (and special affairs) and related complaints as follows:

Members 
The members of the Article 90 of the Constitution Commission of the Islamic Consultative Assembly in the second year of the 11th term of the Assembly are as follows:

See also 
 Specialized Commissions of the Parliament of Iran
 Integration Commission of the Islamic Consultative Assembly
 Joint Commission of the Islamic Consultative Assembly
 Special Commission of the Islamic Consultative Assembly
 The history of the parliament in Iran

References

Committees of the Iranian Parliament
Islamic Consultative Assembly